Stenoptilia neblina is a moth of the family Pterophoridae. It is known from Venezuela.

Its wingspan is about 21 mm. Adults are on wing in February.

Its host plant is unknown, but an adult was collected near Tyleria and Bonnetia plants.

External links

neblina
Moths described in 1995
Moths of South America
Taxa named by Cees Gielis